Gideon Tish is a former Israeli football player.

Career 
In the 1950, Tish was an Israeli football player who is most known for playing at Hapoel Tel Aviv, there he scored 55 goals which places him as one of the greatest scorers in the history of the club.

Honours
Israeli Premier League:
Winner (3): 1956-57, 1965-66, 1968-69
Israel State Cup:
Winner (1): 1961
Footballer of the Year in Israel: 1963
AFC Asian Cup:
Winner (1): 1964

References

1939 births
Living people
Israeli footballers
Hapoel Tel Aviv F.C. players
Hapoel Herzliya F.C. players
Footballers from Tel Aviv
1960 AFC Asian Cup players
1964 AFC Asian Cup players
Association football midfielders
Hapoel Herzliya F.C. managers
Israeli Footballer of the Year recipients